Jane may refer to:
 Jane (given name), a feminine given name
 Jane (surname), related to the given name

Film and television
 Jane (1915 film), a silent comedy film directed by Frank Lloyd
 Jane (2016 film), a South Korean drama film starring Lee Min-ji
 Jane (2017 film), an American documentary film about Jane Goodall
 Jane (2022 film), an American psychological thriller directed by Sabrina Jaglom
 Jane (TV series), an 1980s British television series

Music
Jane (album), an album by Jane McDonald
 Jane (American band)
 Jane (German band)
 Jane, unaccompanied and original singer of "It's a Fine Day" in 1983

Songs 
 "Jane" (Barenaked Ladies song), 1994
 "Jane", a song by Ben Folds Five from their 1999 album The Unauthorized Biography of Reinhold Messner
 "Jane" (Century song)
 "Jane", a song by Elf Power
 "Jane", a song by EPMD from Strictly Business
 "Jane" (Jefferson Starship song), 1979
 "Jane", a song by the Loved Ones from Keep Your Heart
 "Jane, Jane", a song by Peter, Paul and Mary from See What Tomorrow Brings album, 1965]

Print media 
Jane (comic strip), a British comic strip that appeared in The Daily Mirror from 1932 to 1959
Jane (magazine), an American fashion magazine published from 1997 to 2007
Jane, a 1900 novel by Marie Corelli
Jane (play), a 1946 play by S.N. Behrman, based on a Maugham short story

Organizations 
 Jane Collective, an abortion provider c. 1970
 Jane's Information Group or Jane's, a publisher
 Jane, a part of Estée Lauder Companies

Ships
 Jane (ship), a ship that disappeared in 1816
 , a United States Navy patrol boat in commission from 1917 to 1918

Other uses 
 Jane (dinosaur), juvenile specimen
 Jane Doe or Jane Roe, female equivalent of John Doe (placeholder name for unknown persons or persons whose identity is withheld, in legal contexts)
 Jane (software), a GUI-based integrated software package for the Commodore 128
 Jane Street, in Toronto
 Jane (TTC), a Toronto subway station
 Jane, slang term for a female client of a prostitute
 Jane's Carousel, a carousel at the Brooklyn Bridge Park in New York City

See also 

 
 Janes (disambiguation)
 "Jane Jane", a song by Golden Earring from their 1986 album The Hole
 "Jane, Jane, Jane", a song by The Kingston Trio
 Jain (disambiguation)
 Jayne
 Jayna